Glyphea is a genus of fossil glypheoid crustaceans that lived from the Jurassic to the Eocene. It includes the following species:

Glyphea alexandri Taylor, 1979
Glyphea arborinsularis Etheridge Jr., 1917
Glyphea australensis Feldmann, Tshudy & Thomson, 1993
Glyphea bathonica De Ferry, 1865
Glyphea bohemica Fritsch, 1887
Glyphea calloviensis H. Woods, 1927
Glyphea carteri Bell, 1863
Glyphea christeyi Feldmann & Maxwell, 1999
Glyphea crassa Oppel, 1861
Glyphea cretacea McCoy, 1854
Glyphea foresti Feldmann & de Saint Laurent, 2002
Glyphea georgianus Taylor, 1979
Glyphea gussmanni Schütze, 1907
Glyphea jeletzkyi Feldmann & McPherson, 1980
Glyphea liasina Von Meyer, 1840
Glyphea lyrica Blake, 1876
Glyphea muensteri (Voltz, 1835)
Glyphea oculata J. Woods, 1957
Glyphea prestwichi H. Woods, 1929
Glyphea pseudastacus
Glyphea pseudoscyllarus (Schlotheim, 1822)
Glyphea regleyana (Desmarest, 1822)
Glyphea reticulata Feldmann & Gazdzicki, 1997
Glyphea robusta Feldmann & McPherson, 1980
Glyphea rostrata (Phillips, 1829)
Glyphea squamosa (Münster, 1839)
Glyphea stilwelli Feldmann, 1993
Glyphea tomesi Woodward, 1868
Glyphea udressieri Von Meyer, 1840
Glyphea vectensis H. Woods, 1927
Glyphea willetti (Woodward, 1878)

See also 
Neoglyphea and Laurentaeglyphea, the only extant glypheoids

References 

Glypheidea
Late Jurassic crustaceans
Late Cretaceous crustaceans
Eocene crustaceans
Fossil taxa described in 1835
Prehistoric animals of Africa
Prehistoric animals of Asia
Cretaceous animals of South America
Jurassic genus first appearances
Eocene genus extinctions
Paleocene crustaceans
Early Cretaceous crustaceans
Middle Jurassic crustaceans
Early Jurassic crustaceans
Cretaceous arthropods of Australia